The Dentelles de Montmirail are a small chain of mountains in Provence in France, in the département of Vaucluse, located just to the south of the village of Vaison-la-Romaine.

They are foothills of the highest peak in Provence, Mont Ventoux, which is situated just to the east.  The dramatically jagged shape of their peaks was formed by horizontal strata of Jurassic limestone being folded and forced into a nearly upright position and subsequently eroded into sharp-edged ridges and spikes. The highest peak of the Dentelles is St-Amand, at 734 m (2,400 ft). The range, which is about 8 km wide, offers over 600 trails for walking, rock  climbing, and mountain  biking. The foot  of the Dentelles is surrounded by vineyards of the Rhône Valley.

Etymology 
Their name dentelles, the French word for lace, refers to their shape obtained by erosion, while Montmirail is derived from  the Latin mons mirabilis meaning 'admirable mountain'.

History
Located on the territory of the communes of Beaumes-de-Venise, Crestet, Gigondas, La Roque-Alric, Lafare, Le Barroux, Malaucène, Suzette, and Vacqueyras; the Dentelles de Montmirail were an important  natural  frontier during Antiquity  between the tribes of the Memini in the south, and the Voconces in  the north.

References

Further reading 
 Scheibli, Isabelle (2002) Les Dentelles de Montmirail. Invitation à la flanerie, Conseil d'Architecture, d'Urbanisme et de l'Environnement de Vaucluse, Avignon

External links
 Les Dentelles de Montmirail 

Mountain ranges of Provence-Alpes-Côte d'Azur
Landforms of Vaucluse